Rosie Swings Softly is a 1960 studio album by Rosemary Clooney, recorded originally by MGM Records.

Track listing
 "For You" (Joe Burke, Al Dubin) – 1:56
 "Always Together" (Heino Gaze, Carl Sigman) – 2:48
 "You Ol' Son of a Gun" (Danny Arnold, Hal Dickinson, Jack Lloyd) – 2:33
 "I Wonder" (Gilbert) – 2:49
 "Always Be in Love" (Ian Bernard) – 2:24
 "Grieving for You" (Joe Gibson, Jack Gold, Joe Ribaud) – 2:48
 "With You and Me" (Bernard) – 2:22
 "Looking For a Boy" (George Gershwin, Ira Gershwin) – 2:13
 "With the Night" (Bernard) – 2:59
 "Love Eyes" (Moose Charlap, Norman Gimbel) – 2:31
 "Sorry for Myself" (Charlap, Gimbel) – 2:40
 "Keep It Simple" (Ray Evans, Jay Livingston) – 2:58

Personnel

Performance
 Rosemary Clooney – vocal

References

1960 albums
Rosemary Clooney albums
Verve Records albums